Julia Lyman Trotman (born March 25, 1968) is an American former competitive sailor who won a bronze medal at the 1992 Olympic Games in Barcelona  in the Women’s One Person Dinghy sailing event. She was the Collegiate Women’s Single-handed Champion in both 1989 and 1992, as well as 1992 Rolex Yachtswoman of the Year. She served as captain of the women’s ice hockey and sailing teams at Harvard in 1989. She was inducted into the Harvard Athletic Hall of Fame in 2004.  She was inducted into the Andover Academy Athletics Hall of Fame in 2012.

She was born in New York City, New York.  She was married to former Olympic silver medalist, Jim Brady.  They have two daughters, Lila and Claire.

Career
At the 1992 Summer Olympics, Trotman finished in 3rd place in the Europe class.  After graduating from Harvard, she became an editorial assistant at American Heritage magazine.  She went to Harvard Business School (1997), worked at McKinsey for four years and then The VIA Agency for 15 years. She is now a partner at Valo Ventures in Palo Alto, CA.

References

 

1968 births
American female sailors (sport)
Living people
Olympic bronze medalists for the United States in sailing
Sailors at the 1992 Summer Olympics – Europe
US Sailor of the Year
Harvard University alumni
Medalists at the 1992 Summer Olympics
21st-century American women